Mirza Hossein Khan Ajudan Bashi was a 19th-century Iranian diplomat. He was a Member of the Maragheh Khanate. He was sent to France in 1839 by the Persian ruler Mohammad Shah Qajar following the conflict between Persia and Great Britain over the possession of Herat in Afghanistan. In the wake of the Herat affair, Great Britain would remove its military and diplomatic missions from Persia, and occupy Kharg island and attack Bushehr.

By dispatching Mirza Hossein Khan, Mohammad Shah Qajar resumed diplomatic relations with France. The diplomatic mission reached Louis-Philippe and asked for military help. In response, a group of French officers was sent to Persia with the returning ambassador. Louis-Philippe said:

 

Mirza Hossein Khan also visited Vienna and London as Ambassador Extraordinary, where Palmerston refused to receive him and rejected his mission. He died 1866-67. He left a son Ali Khan, who died in 1884

See also
 France-Iran relations
 Franco-Persian alliance

Notes

Iranian diplomats
19th-century Iranian politicians
Ambassadors of Iran to France
People of Qajar Iran